CSA Steaua București is a Romanian professional handball club based in Bucharest, Romania. It competes in the Romanian Handball League. They are part of the CSA Steaua sports organization.

History 
Founded in the late 1940s as part of the CSA Steaua army sports club. The handball section has won a record 28 national championships and 9 Romanian cups. Steaua won two EHF Champions League titles as well as reaching two further finals.

In 2006, they won the EHF Challenge Cup with Vasile Stîngă as their coach. The club played under various names throughout the years for sponsorship reasons.

Their biggest rival is Dinamo Bucharest with whom they contest the Bucharest derby.

Crest, colours, supporters

Naming history

Kits

Team

Current squad 

Squad for the 2022–23 season

Technical staff
 Head coach:  Ovidiu Mihăilă
 Assistant coach:  Ștefan Laufceac

Transfers
Transfers for the 2022–23 season

Joining 
  Alireza Mousavi (LP) from  CS Dinamo București
  Savo Mešter (CB) from  RK Metaloplastika

Leaving

Honours 

 Double
Winners (6): 1980–81, 1984–85, 1989–90, 1999–00, 2000–01, 2007–08

European record

European Cup and Champions League

EHF Challenge Cup

EHF ranking

Former club members

Notable former players

  Silviu Băiceanu (1999–2003)
  Ciprian Beșta (1991–1994)
  Ștefan Birtalan (1970–1985)
  Octavian Bizău (2017–2019)
  Sebastian Bota (1991–1997)
  Alexandru Buligan (1981–1982)
  Ionuț Ciobanu (2005–2010, 2021-)
  Alexandru Dedu (1991–1996)
  Cristian Gațu (1968–1978)
  Gheorghe Gruia (1961–1973)
  Javier Humet (2018–2020)
  Ionuț Iancu (2021–)
  Josef Jakob (1963–1971)
  Andrei Mihalcea (2018–)
  Marius Novanc (2005–2010)
  Alin Șania (2005–2009)
  Ciprian Șandru (2021–)
  Hansi Schmidt (1961–1963)
  Tudor Stănescu (2016–)
  Marius Stavrositu (2007–2010, 2017-2019)
  Vasile Stîngă (1977–1989)
  Werner Stöckl (1969–1981)
  Marius Szőke (2011–2017)
  Radu Voina (1972–1991)
  Marin Vegar (2018–2019)
  Ivan Matskevich (2015–2017)
  João Pedro Silva (2019-2020)
  Guilherme Valadão Gama (2019-2020)
  Rodrigo Salinas Muñoz (2014-2015)
  Nikola Kedžo (2017-2019)
  Guillermo Corzo (2014–2015)
  Ahmed Khairy (2020-2021)
  Mohsen Babasafari (2017-2019)
  Alireza Mousavi (2022-)
  Nemanja Grbović (2018-2019, 2020-)
  Milan Popović (2021-)
  Samvel Aslanyan (2017-2021)
  Miloš Kostadinović (2016-2018)
  Krsto Milošević (2018-)
  Stefan Vujić (2017-2019)
  Mosbah Sanaï (2020-2021)

((flagocon|SRB)) ((OBRAD IVEZIC)) ((2007-2010))

References

External links
 
 

Romanian handball clubs
Handball
Sport in Bucharest
Handball clubs established in 1949
1949 establishments in Romania
Liga Națională (men's handball)